"Lotta That" is a song by American rapper G-Eazy. It was released on June 10, 2014, as the sixth single from his debut studio album These Things Happen (2014). The song was produced by Eazy himself and Christoph Andersson. It also features guest appearances from American rapper ASAP Ferg and English rapper Danny Seth.

Chart performance
This single reached number 14 on the US Billboard Bubbling Under Hot 100 Singles and peaked at number 32 on the US Billboard Hot R&B/Hip-Hop Songs chart. On April 4, 2018, the single was certified gold by the Recording Industry Association of America (RIAA) for sales of over 500,000 digital copies in the United States.

Credits and personnel
Credits and personnel are adapted from the These Things Happen album liner notes.
 G-Eazy – writer, vocals, producer
 Christoph Andersson – writer, producer, recording
 ASAP Ferg – writer, vocals
 Danny Seth Bell – writer, vocals
 James W. Lavigne – writer, background vocals
 Jaycen Joshua – mixing
 Ryan Paul – mixing assistant
 Dave Kutch – mastering

Charts

Certifications

References

External links

2014 singles
2014 songs
G-Eazy songs
ASAP Ferg songs
RCA Records singles
Songs written by ASAP Ferg
Songs written by G-Eazy